Guangfeng District is a district of the city of Shangrao, located in Northeastern Jiangxi Province, Eastern China.

The easternmost county-level division of Jiangxi, Guangfeng borders Zhejiang and Fujian provinces.

The population is 760,000 people.

History
The district was first established during the Tang dynasty in 758 as a county, then repealed in 812. In 1074, during the Song dynasty, the district was reestablished as a county.

Administration
Guangfeng has been a county for over 1,300 years. Administratively, the district is part of the prefecture-level city of Shangrao. The county administers 23 townships.

In the present, Guangfeng District has 3 subdistricts, 16 towns and 4 townships.
3 subdistricts
 Yongfeng
 Lulin
 Fengxi

16 towns

4 townships

Climate 
The climate is temperate, with abundant rainfall during the monsoon season. It has clearly differentiated summers and winters.

Economy
Guangfeng was once a poor district, but now it is one of the wealthiest counties of Jiangxi. The most famous industry of the district is the tobacco industry. The GDP of 2005 is 7.29 billion.

Features
Guangfeng's most famous feature is Boshan Temple, which lies in the west of the county. The Buddhist temple has a history over 1000 years. Xin Qiji, the famous poet of the South Song dynasty, visited it often.

Sheshantou Site, in Guangfeng District, is an important Neolithic archaeological site of Jiangxi Province.

References

Gallery

Shangrao
County-level divisions of Jiangxi